= Abdourahman Cheick Mohamed =

Djiboutian politician and prosecutor

Abdourahman Cheick Mohamed was a Djiboutian politician and prosecutor who served as President of Supreme Court of Djibouti. He died on May 16, 2023 in France after a stroke.
